Orondo is an unincorporated community in Douglas County, Washington, United States, located alongside the eastern part of the Columbia River. It is part of the Wenatchee–East Wenatchee Metropolitan Statistical Area. The area is well known for its robust agriculture industry, and produce fruits such as apples, cherries and pears. The name was derived from a mythical Great Lake Indian and was first settled in the late 19th century by late Washington politician, John B. Smith.

The Auvil Fruit Company is located in Orondo, which has introduce Granny Smiths, establishing M26 root stock, and fostering quality production of Fuji Apples in Washington state by the help of the founder, Grady Auvil.

The town supports one 76 gas station/convenience store named the "Orondo Market Place", a U.S. Post Office, an Elementary school, and a multitude of fruit stands along U.S. Highway 97.  Desert Canyon Golf course is also located and features a restaurant and accommodations.

In 2018, the Subway restaurant that was located in the "Orondo Market Place" closed down

According to United States Census, the population is estimated to be 1995 with a marginal error of 338 as of 2017.

Parks
Daroga State Park: A 127-acre camping park with 1.5 miles of Columbia River shoreline on the elevated edge of the desert scab-lands. First established as an orchard/ranch site in 1928, the name derived as the first letters of Auvil brother: Dave, Robert, and Grandy. A new peach was developed cataloged as the Daroga Peach. In 1981, Grady Auvil sold the property to the state of Washington and is now currently owned by the Chelan County PUD but operated by Washington State Parks.

Orondo River Park: established in 1972, the park has been a recreational site since 1976. The port of Douglas and Chelan County PUD own property within the park boundaries.

In October 2017, the port of Douglas has asked the Chelan PUD take over operation and ownership of the facility due to the park losing money for years.

Education
The town has one school district that operates the preschool, elementary and middle school.

The district is a "non-high" school district and has no high school opportunity in the town. As a result, the neighboring schools provide high school education for Freshman through Senior students.

History
1887, the townsite of Orondo was established by J.B Smith.

1888, Smith donated a plot of land to attract more settlers to Orondo

Agricultural Industry

Businesses

Environment

Climate

Literature
In East of the Mountains (1999), Orondo is mentioned when one of two Spanish speaking brothers on a bus asked Catherine Donnelly, where they are and wondering how long till they arrive at Orondo. The brothers then mentioned that they work at Orondo picking apples.

References

Unincorporated communities in Washington (state)
Unincorporated communities in Douglas County, Washington
Wenatchee–East Wenatchee metropolitan area
Washington (state) populated places on the Columbia River